The brigade combat team (BCT) is the basic deployable unit of maneuver in the U.S. Army. A brigade combat team consists of one combat arms branch maneuver brigade, and its assigned support and fire units. A brigade is normally commanded by a colonel (O-6) although in some cases a brigadier general (O-7) may assume command. A brigade combat team contains combat support and combat service support units necessary to sustain its operations. BCTs contain organic artillery training and support, received from the parent division artillery (DIVARTY). There are three types of brigade combat teams: infantry, Stryker, and armored.

Currently, the U.S. Army is structured around the brigade combat team. In this program, divisions that previously had not deployed individual brigades due to lack of integral support have now been restructured. The 1st Armored Division, 25th Infantry Division, etc. now have the ability to deploy one or more BCTs anywhere in the world. These BCTs are intended to be able to stand on their own, like a division in miniature. The soldiers assigned to a BCT will stay at their assignment for three years; this is intended to bolster readiness and improve unit cohesion.

Infantry brigade combat team

The infantry brigade combat team, as of 2014, contains 4,413 soldiers and is organized around three battalions of infantry. Each type of brigade (infantry or airborne infantry) has the same basic organization. Each infantry brigade is equipped and capable of air assault operations. Also, most units typically maneuver in HMMWVs when deployed and operate as "motorized infantry" to facilitate speed of movement. The Infantry BCT can conduct entry operations by ground, air, and amphibious means.

The infantry brigade combat team consists of seven battalions: one cavalry (reconnaissance) battalion, one brigade support battalion, one engineer battalion, three infantry battalions and one field artillery (fires) battalion.

Infantry battalion (×3)
Note: OCONUS (Hawaii, Alaska and Italy) based BCTs only have two infantry battalions
 Headquarters and headquarters company
 Rifle company (×3)
 Weapons company

Cavalry squadron
 Headquarters and headquarters troop 
 Mounted cavalry troop (×2)
 Dismounted cavalry troop

Field artillery (fires) battalion 
 Headquarters and headquarters battery
Target acquisition platoon
 M119 105mm towed howitzer battery (×2)
 M777A2 155mm towed howitzer battery

Brigade engineer battalion
 Headquarters and headquarters company
 Combat engineer company (×2)
 Signal network support company
 Military intelligence company

Brigade support battalion
 Headquarters and headquarters company
 Distribution company
 Field maintenance company
 Medical company
 Headquarters platoon
 Treatment platoon
 Medical evacuation platoon
 Forward support company (reconnaissance)
 Forward support company (engineer)
 Forward support company (infantry) (×3)
 Forward support company (Field Artillery)

Stryker brigade combat team

The Stryker brigade combat team (SBCT) is a mechanized infantry force structured around the Stryker eight-wheeled variant of the General Dynamics LAV III. A full Stryker brigade was intended to be C-130 Hercules air transportable into theatre within 96 hours, while a division-sized force is expected to need 120 hours. The Stryker brigade is an organic combined arms unit of lightly-armored, medium-weight wheeled vehicles, and is organized differently from the infantry or armored brigade combat teams. The Stryker brigades are being used to implement network-centric warfare doctrines, and are intended to fill a gap between the United States' highly mobile light infantry and its much heavier armored infantry. The team also receives training in chemical, biological, radiological, and nuclear defense (CBRN defense).

Each Stryker brigade combat team consists of three infantry battalions, one reconnaissance (cavalry) squadron, one fires (artillery) battalion, one brigade support battalion, one brigade headquarters and headquarters company, and one brigade engineer battalion. A Stryker brigade is made up of more than 300 Stryker vehicles and 4,500 soldiers.

Starting in 2015, the anti-tank company was reflagged from the brigade engineer battalion to the cavalry squadron, to form a weapons troop—also incorporating the mobile gun systems from the infantry battalions.

Infantry battalion (×3)
 Headquarters and headquarters company
 Infantry company (Stryker) (×3)

Cavalry squadron
 Headquarters and headquarters troop
 Cavalry troop (Stryker) (×3)
 Weapons troop (9 × ATGM)

Field artillery (fires) battalion 

 Headquarters and headquarters battery
Target acquisition platoon
 M777A2 155mm towed howitzer battery (×3)

Brigade support battalion
 Headquarters and headquarters company
 Distribution company
 Medical company
 Forward support company (reconnaissance)
 Forward support company (engineer)
 Forward support company (infantry) (×3)
 Forward support company (field artillery)

Brigade engineer battalion
 Headquarters and headquarters company
 Combat engineer company
 Engineer support company
 Signal company
 Military intelligence company

Stryker vehicles
 M1126 Infantry Carrier Vehicle
 M1127 Reconnaissance Vehicle
 M1128 Mobile Gun System armed with 105 mm overhead gun for direct fire
 M1129 Mortar Carrier armed with a mounted 120 mm and a dismountable 81 or 60 mm Mortar
 M1130 Command Vehicle
 M1131 Fire Support Vehicle (FSV) with targeting and surveillance sensors
 M1132 Engineer Support Vehicle (ESV)
 M1133 Medical Evacuation Vehicle (MEV)
 M1134 Anti-Tank Guided Missile Vehicle (ATGM) armed with a twin TOW missile launcher. 
 M1135 Nuclear, Biological, Chemical, Reconnaissance Vehicle (NBC RV)

Armored brigade combat team

The armored brigade combat team (ABCT) is the army's primary armored force. It is designed around combined arms battalions (CABs) that contain both M1 Abrams tanks and M2 Bradley infantry fighting vehicles (IFVs). Other vehicles, such as HMMWVs and M113 armored personnel carrier, operate in a supporting role. In the future, it will also contain vehicles from the Armored Multi-Purpose Vehicle and likely the Optionally Manned Fighting Vehicle (OMFV).

An armored brigade combat team consists of seven battalions: three combined arms battalions, one cavalry (reconnaissance) squadron, one artillery battalion, one engineer battalion and one brigade support battalion. As of 2014, the armored brigade combat team is the largest brigade combat team formation with 4,743 soldiers. Prior to 2012, the armored brigade combat team was named the heavy brigade combat team.

An ABCT includes 87 Abrams, 152 Bradley IFVs, 18 M109s and 45 armed M113 vehicles. The operational cost for these combat systems is $66,735 per mile. The range of the Abrams limits the brigade to 330 km (205 miles), requiring fuel every 12 hours. The brigade can self-transport 738,100 L (195,000 gallons) of fuel, which is transported by 15 19,000 L (5,000 gal) M969A1 tankers and 48 9,500 L (2,500 gal) M978 tankers.

Prior to 2016, the CAB contained two tank companies and two mechanized infantry companies. In 2016, the CAB was reorganized to have two variations; an "armored battalion" biased towards armor, with two tank companies and one mechanized infantry company, and a "mechanized infantry" battalion biased towards infantry, with two mechanized infantry companies and one tank company. The ABCTs thus adopted a "triangle" structure of two armored battalions and one mechanized infantry battalion. This resulted in an overall reduction of two mechanized infantry companies; the deleted armored company was reflagged to the cavalry squadron.

Pre-2016 organizational restructure for combined armor/infantry assets

Combined Arms Battalion (×3)
 Headquarters and Headquarters Company (HHC)
 Tank Company (×2)
 Mechanized Infantry Company (×2)

Post-2016 organizational restructure for combined armor/infantry assets

Armored Battalion (×2)
 Headquarters and Headquarters Company
 Tank Company (×2)
 Mechanized Infantry Company

Mechanized Infantry Battalion (×1)
 Headquarters and Headquarters Company
 Tank Company
 Mechanized Infantry Company (×2)

Cavalry Squadron
 Headquarters and headquarters troop
 Cavalry Troop (×3)
 Tank Company (×1)

Field Artillery Battalion
 Headquarters and Headquarters Battery
Target Acquisition Platoon
 M109 155mm Self-propelled Howitzer Battery (×3)

Brigade Engineer Battalion
 Headquarters and Headquarters Company
 Military Intelligence Company
 Signal Network Support Company
 Combat Engineer Company (×2)

Brigade Support Battalion
 Headquarters and Headquarters Company
 Distribution Company
 Field Maintenance Company
 Medical Company
 Headquarters Platoon
 Treatment Platoon
 Medical Evacuation Platoon
 Forward Support Company (Cavalry)
 Forward Support Company (Combined Arms) (×3)
 Forward Support Company (Field Artillery)
 Forward Support Company (Engineer)

Modernization

The U.S. Army planned to implement elements of the BCT Modernization program in 2010. This program was planned to utilize elements from the Future Combat Systems program that was canceled in early 2009.

The program came in two segments. The first to be implemented would be the Early Infantry Brigade Combat Team Capability Package (Early IBCT Package), which would modernize infantry brigade combat teams. The second to be implemented would be the Follow-on Incremental Capabilities Package, which could modernize all brigades.

Reorganization
After the 2013 reform's round of de-activations and downsizing, the below numbers represent the number of BCTs that will be left in the US Army's Active Component. (Numbers after the brigade re-organization in brackets)

Combat brigades: 45 (32)
 17 (10) armored brigade combat teams
 8 (8) Stryker brigade combat teams
 20 (14) infantry brigade combat teams including airborne IBCTs

In July 2015, the Army announced the reduction of 2 additional BCTs as part of ongoing reductions to an end strength of 450,000. In addition to the reduction, one active Stryker BCT will convert to an infantry BCT, and its vehicles will be used to convert an Army National Guard BCT from armored to Stryker.

In April 2017, the Army confirmed that the proposed downsizing of 4/25 (Airborne) BCT was being reversed, and the BCT retained.

As of September 2018, the active duty component of United States Army consists of 31 brigade combat teams:
 14 infantry brigade combat teams (including airborne brigades)
 10 armored brigade combat teams
 7 Stryker brigade combat teams

On 20 September 2018, the Army announced that the 1st Brigade Combat Team of the 1st Armored Division (1/1 AD) stationed at Fort Bliss, Texas, will convert from a Stryker brigade combat team (SBCT) to an armored brigade combat team (ABCT); and the 2nd Brigade Combat Team of the 4th Infantry Division (2/4 ID) stationed at Fort Carson, Colorado, will convert from an infantry brigade combat team (IBCT) to a SBCT. The conversion of the 1st Brigade Combat Team, 1st Armored Division, and the 2nd Brigade Combat Team, 4th Infantry Division, were planned to begin in the spring of 2019 and spring of 2020 respectively. With 25th Infantry Division Alaska's change to 11th Airborne Division in 2022, the Army will have one less Stryker Brigade and one more Infantry brigade, changing the total to 15 IBCT's and 6 SBCT's.

Army National Guard brigade combat teams have the same TOE as active duty component BCTs. As of September 2018, the Army National Guard consists of 27 BCTs:
 20 infantry brigade combat teams
 5 armored brigade combat teams
 2 Stryker brigade combat teams

See also
 Reorganization plan of the United States Army
 Regimental combat team
 USMC Marine Air-Ground Task Force, for comparison

References

Additional reading
 FM 3–20.96 Reconnaissance and Cavalry Squadron
 FM 3–21.20 The Infantry Battalion
 FM 3–96 Brigade Combat Team
 FM 3–90.61 The Brigade Special Troops Battalion

Brigade combat teams of the United States Army|000
Tables of Organisation and Equipment